Ronnbergia tonduzii is a species of flowering plant in the family Bromeliaceae, native to Colombia, Costa Rica, Ecuador and Panama. It was first described in 1903 as Aechmea tonduzii.

References

Bromelioideae
Flora of Costa Rica
Flora of Panama
Flora of Colombia
Flora of Ecuador
Plants described in 1903